Canada women's national inline hockey team is the national team for Canada, which participates at the FIRS Inline Hockey World Championships, an event by the Comité International de Roller In-Line Hockey (CIRILH), an organization and discipline of the Fédération Internationale de Roller Sports (FIRS). The national team has captured five world championships (2002, 2004, 2005, 2012 and 2016). Canada has enjoyed 14 podium finishes in the FIRS Inline Hockey World Championships from 2002 to 2017. The first tournament without a podium finish took place in 2007.

History
The team finished second at the 2011 Women's World Inline Hockey Championships. The team competed in the 2013 Women's World Inline Hockey Championships. Winning a gold medal at the 2016 Worlds, hosted in Asiago and Roana, Veneto region, Italy, between June 12–25, 2016, it marked the last gold medal currently won by Canada.

Former coaches
 Jeff Danylyk (2002)
Robert Insley (2003)
Gino Delmonte (2004-08)
Kendra Magnus-Sobotka (2009-11)
Donna Forbes (2012-present)

General managers
Sandy Nimmo (2002)
Robert Coughlin (2003-04)
Gino Delmonte (2006-08)
Donna Forbes

Competition achievements

World Championships

Gold Medal Winning Rosters

2002

2004

2005

2012

2016
Incomplete list

Awards and honors
2012 World Inline Championship Leading Scorer: Jackie Jarrell

References

External links
Canada Inline Official Site
FIRS Official Site

National inline hockey teams
Inline hockey
Inline hockey in Canada